GGL domain  is domain found in the gamma subunit of the heterotrimeric G protein complex and in regulators of G protein signaling RGS proteins.

Human proteins containing this domain 
 GNG4; GNG10; GNG11
 GNGT1
 RGS6; RGS7; RGS9; RGS11

See also
Beta-gamma complex

References

Further reading

Protein domains
Peripheral membrane proteins